Day of the Macedonian Uprising is a public holiday in North Macedonia, commemorating what is considered there the beginning of the communist resistance against fascism during World War II in Yugoslav Macedonia, on October 11.

According to the Yugoslav Marxist historiography and the current Macedonian historiography, the Macedonian uprising against fascism began on this day in 1941, lasting until late 1944. However, whether the events that occurred on this date were the beginning of an effective uprising, was disputed even by some Yugoslav circles. It has been celebrated as a national holiday since the times of Socialist Federal Republic of Yugoslavia (SFRY) in the then-SR Macedonia.

Historical background 
In April 1941, during the Second World War, the Axis powers invaded the Kingdom of Yugoslavia, of which today North Macedonia was part. It encompassed most of the so-called Vardar Banovina, because the very name Macedonia was prohibited in the Kingdom of Yugoslavia. Six months later, on October 11, 1941, a group of Yugoslav Communists attacked several Bulgarian administration's objects in Prilep. These were 16 men, who in the evening, divided into three groups, attacked as follows: the first group - the police station, the second - the prison, and the third group eavesdropped on the telephone conversations, through a device connected to the telephone line, near the police precinct. 

Making a quick and surprise attack around 10 p.m, they opened fire on the post guard and the precinct. As a result of the attack, the watchman was killed, and another policeman was wounded. The attackers then ran away. Immediately after the end of the attack, the town was blocked for a search for them. The attack was ineffective, its participants were quickly arrested, while its leaders were imprisoned in Bulgaria until the end of the war. The activity of the local Communists didn't pose any significant challenge for the regime then.

After the war, the area of present-day North Macedonia became part of Democratic Federal Yugoslavia, as Democratic Federal Macedonia (DFM). In 1945, the National Assembly of DFM passed a law declaring the day 11 October a public holiday of the state. It was celebrated for the first time on October 11, 1945. After the breakup of Yugoslavia, it was adopted as a public holiday again, after then SR Macedonia proclaimed its independence in 1991.

Celebration and symbolism 
Every year on October 11 there are official ceremonies, public speeches, and celebrations. There is an official award called 11 October, given out to Macedonian people who have contributed significantly to the national progress. The company FAS Sanos used to bear the name FAS "11. Oktobar" AD Skopje. Some primary schools in North Macedonia are named "11 October".

Controversy

Historical overview 
When Bulgarian Army entered the then-Yugoslav province of Vardar Banovina in April 1941, the Bulgarian soldiers were greeted by the locals as liberators, while pro-Bulgarian and anti-Serbian feelings among them prevailed. Despite this welcome, the Macedonians did not wish to become "fully fledged Bulgarians and annexed by Bulgaria, as Sofia assumed at the time". After the Bulgarian takeover the local communists fell in the sphere of influence of the Bulgarian Communist Party. They refused to define the Bulgarian forces as occupiers. In fact, the Macedonian Slavs were regarded by the authorities then as Bulgarians, and it is questionable whether then they considered themselves to be a separate nationality. In addition, up to one half of the Bulgarian army and police stationed in the area from 1941 to 1944 consisted of local conscripts. Thus, the only victim of the attack on October 11, 1941, was a local man conscripted in the Bulgarian police. Moreover, fascism in Bulgaria didn't become a mass movement during WWII. 

Initially there was no organized resistance in the area, however resentment towards the arrogant Bulgarian officials began within months of the occupation. Resistance started to grow in 1943 with the capitulation of Italy and the Soviet victories over Nazi Germany.

Cold war development 
During the Cold war, the celebration of this holiday was criticized by the United States-based Macedonian Patriotic Organization. Since 1960, this day has been marked by the organization as "Mourning Day of Macedonia". In the same year, it was also celebrated by the MPO society in Brussels, Belgium. According to the MPO, the leaders of the so-called "Macedonian state", which has been actually an enslaved Tito's banovina, renounced their native Bulgarian name on October 11. Ivan Mihailov, the last leader of Internal Macedonian Revolutionary Organization, also took an attitude against the holiday. In an article published in the newspaper Macedonian Tribune in 1973, he compared it to the tragical Battle of Kleidion. Mihailov claimed that the Marxists, supported by their pro-Serbian anti-Bulgarian drive, have decided to blind spiritually one million Bulgarians in Macedonia by tampering their past. The most massive celebration of the "Mourning Day of Macedonia" was in 1977, when the MPO sent a circular to all its divisions. It says: "We are obliged to make any sacrifices to eliminate the injustice done to our people after the Second World War".

Today 
After the Fall of communism, in Bulgaria, the celebration of this holiday became disputed. It is claimed there, this is a celebration of hatred against Bulgaria itself, inherited from the times of Yugoslav communism. Bulgaria denies any occupation and insists that during WWII its forces liberated twice, their brethren in the west. Sofia also denies in Bulgaria existed a fascist regime, while the Western authorities on the issue categorically deny this too. It insists that the two countries must "harmonize" school textbooks, as well as historic literature and "overcoming the hate speech" against Bulgaria. On October 11, 2020, Bulgarian MEP Andrey Kovatchev criticized Macedonian PM Zoran Zaev for celebrating 11 October, seeing it as an "anti-Bulgarian provocation". One month later, on November 17, 2020, Bulgaria effectively blocked the official beginning of EU accession talks with North Macedonia. Several days later, in an interview with Bulgarian media, the Macedonian Prime Minister Zoran Zaev stated that Bulgaria was not a fascist occupier during WWII and that it was later involved in the liberation of present-day North Macedonia, as part of the anti-fascist front. The interview resulted in sharp criticism from the Macedonian public, while the opposition's leader Hristijan Mickoski accused Zaev of threatening Macedonian national identity. The Macedonian journalist Dejan Azeski has confirmed that Zaev's interview was a political mistake, although it revealed the historical truth. According to Azeski, for many locals the Bulgarian army was a liberating force in 1941, while the partisan movement really did not emerge in significance until after 1943. The Bulgarian military also took part in the liberation of present-day North Macedonia in the autumn of 1944, and these are the most difficult facts to be accepted by the Macedonian society today.

See also 
 Public holidays in North Macedonia
 List of World War II monuments and memorials in North Macedonia
 World War II in Yugoslav Macedonia

References 

History of North Macedonia
National holidays
Yugoslav Macedonia in World War II 
Communism in North Macedonia
Public holidays in North Macedonia
Observances in North Macedonia